Köves is a Hungarian language surname from the Hungarian word for "stony". Notable people with the surname include:

Csaba Köves (born 1966), Hungarian fencer
Gábor Köves (born 1970), Hungarian tennis player
József Köves (born 1938), Hungarian writer
Nóra Köves (born 1971), Hungarian tennis player
Slomó Köves (born 1979), Hungarian rabbi
Hungarian-language surnames

Surnames of Hungarian origin